Greenwich London Borough Council is the local authority for the Royal Borough of Greenwich in Greater London, England. It is a London borough council, one of 32 in the United Kingdom capital of London. Greenwich is divided into 23 wards, electing a total of 55 councillors. The council was created by the London Government Act 1963 and replaced two local authorities: Greenwich Metropolitan Borough Council and Woolwich Metropolitan Borough Council. The council meets in Woolwich Town Hall.

History

There have previously been a number of local authorities responsible for the Greenwich area. The current local authority was first elected in 1964, a year before formally coming into its powers and prior to the creation of the London Borough of Greenwich on 1 April 1965. Greenwich London Borough Council replaced Greenwich Metropolitan Borough Council and Woolwich Metropolitan Borough Council.

It was envisaged that through the London Government Act 1963 Greenwich as a London local authority would share power with the Greater London Council. The split of powers and functions meant that the Greater London Council was responsible for "wide area" services such as fire, ambulance, flood prevention, and refuse disposal; with the local authorities responsible for "personal" services such as social care, libraries, cemeteries and refuse collection. This arrangement lasted until 1986 when Greenwich London Borough Council gained responsibility for some services that had been provided by the Greater London Council, such as waste disposal. Greenwich became an education authority in 1990. Since 2000 the Greater London Authority has taken some responsibility for highways and planning control from the council, but within the English local government system the council remains a "most purpose" authority in terms of the available range of powers and functions.

In May 2014 the Labour-run council refused to support the building of a memorial to Lee Rigby, whose murder by Islamists occurred in the borough, in spite of being "overwhelmed by interest in a local memorial". The authority previous faced criticism at the time of the killing, with the cabinet attending an away day immediately after the murder, therefore missing a visit by the Prime Minister. Following a campaign which saw 25,000 people sign a petition in support of the memorial the council dropped its opposition to the tribute.

Powers and functions
The local authority derives its powers and functions from the London Government Act 1963 and subsequent legislation, and has the powers and functions of a London borough council. It sets council tax and as a billing authority also collects precepts for Greater London Authority functions and business rates. It sets planning policies which complement Greater London Authority and national policies, and decides on almost all planning applications accordingly.  It is a local education authority  and is also responsible for council housing, social services, libraries, waste collection and disposal, traffic, and most roads and environmental health.

Summary results of elections

References

Local authorities in London
London borough councils
Politics of the Royal Borough of Greenwich
Leader and cabinet executives
Local education authorities in England
Billing authorities in England